Rasmus Theisen (1837–1908) was a Norwegian civil servant and politician.  From 1875 to 1877, he was the mayor of the town of Bodø in Norway. Later, he served as the County Governor of Nordland county from 1890 until his death in 1908.

References

1837 births
1908 deaths
County governors of Norway
County governors of Nordland